In Arizona, a joint technological education district (JTED) is a school district that offers high school career and technical education programs to partner school districts. The concept was created in 1990, and there are 13 such districts in Arizona. A 14th JTED was proposed for Yuma, the only county in the state without one; it was approved by vote in November 2014 and began operations as STEDY in January 2015.

List of joint technological education districts
Central Arizona Valley Institute of Technology (CAVIT)
Cobre Valley Institute of Technology (CVIT)
Cochise Technology District (CTD)
Coconino Association for Vocations, Industry and Technology (CAVIAT)
East Valley Institute of Technology (EVIT)
Gila Institute for Technology (GIFT)
Mountain Institute Joint Technological Education District (MIJTED)
Northeast Arizona Technological Institute of Vocational Education (NATIVE)
Northern Arizona Vocational Institute of Technology (NAVIT)
Pima County Joint Technical Education District
Southwest Technical Education District of Yuma (STEDY)
Valley Academy for Career and Technology Education (VACTE)
Western Arizona Vocational Education (WAVE)
Western Maricopa Education Center (West-MEC)

References

 
1990 establishments in Arizona
School districts established in 1990